{{Taxobox
| name = Platylimnobia| image = 
| image_caption =
| regnum = Animalia
| phylum = Arthropoda
| classis = Insecta
| ordo = Diptera
| subordo = Nematocera
| infraordo = Tipulomorpha
| superfamilia = Tipuloidea
| familia = Limoniidae
| subfamilia = Limoniinae
| genus = Platylimnobia| genus_authority = Alexander, 1917
| diversity_link = 
| diversity = 
| type_species = Platylimnobia barnardi
| type_species_authority = Alexander, 1917
| subdivision_ranks = Species
| subdivision = see text
| synonyms = 
}}Platylimnobia''' is a genus of crane fly in the family Limoniidae.

Distribution
South Africa.

SpeciesP. barnardi Alexander, 1917P. brinckiana Alexander, 1964P. montana Wood, 1952P. pseudopumila Wood, 1952P. pumila'' Alexander, 1921

References

Limoniidae
Diptera of Africa